John Frampton was a 16th-century English merchant from the West Country, who settled in Spain, was imprisoned and tortured by the Inquisition, and escaped from Cádiz in 1567. He became a translator of Spanish works, partly inspired by revenge.

His publications have a markedly anti-Spanish tone  and include:

 1577: Nicolás Monardes, translated from the 1565 Spanish edition
 1578: Fernández de Enciso, Geography
 1579: The most noble and famous travels of Marco Polo
 1579: Bernardino de Escalante, A discourse of the Navigation which the Portugales doe Make to the Realmes and Provinces of the East Partes of the Worlde, and of the knowledge that growes by them of the great thinges, which are in the Dominion of China: thought to be the second European book (although small) primarily dedicated to China, and the first of them to be made available in English
 1580: Nicolás Monardes, Ioyfull newes out of the newe founde worlde: a new edition enlarged on the basis of the 1574 Spanish edition
 1581: Pedro de Medina, Art of Navigation''

Notes

Bibliography 

16th-century English businesspeople
Spanish–English translators
Victims of the Inquisition
English torture victims
English escapees
Escapees from Spanish detention
16th-century English translators
16th-century merchants
Anti-Spanish sentiment